Austroliotia pulcherrima, is a species of sea snail, a marine gastropod mollusk in the family Liotiidae.

Description
The height of the shell attains 7 mm.

Distribution
This marine species occurs off New South Wales, South Australia, Victoria and Western Australia.

References

 Wilson, B. (1993). Australian Marine Shells. Prosobranch Gastropods. Kallaroo, WA : Odyssey Publishing. Vol.1 1st Edn pp. 1–408

External links
  Australian Faunal Directory: Austroliotia pulcherrima – Department of Sustainability, Environment, Water, Population and Communities

pulcherrima
Gastropods described in 1843